Michael Reed may refer to:

Sportsmen
Michael Reed (cricketer) (born 1988), English cricketer
Michael Reed (soccer) (born 1987), American soccer player
Michael Reed (American football) (born 1972), American football player
Michael Reed (baseball) (born 1992), American baseball outfielder
Mike Reed (American football) (1975–2014), American football player
Mike Reed (boxer) (born 1993), American professional boxer

Others
G. Mike Reed, American computer scientist
Michael Reed (cinematographer) (1929–2022), British cinematographer
Michael C. Reed (born 1942), professor of mathematics at Duke University
Michael J. Reed (1944–2009), British chemist
Mike Reed (politician) (1945–2020), Australian politician
Mike Reed (musician) (born 1974), American jazz drummer

See also
Michael Reid (disambiguation)
Michael Read (born 1941), swimmer
Michael Redd (born 1979), American basketball player
Mike Read (born 1947), DJ
Mike Reid (disambiguation)